Tanera Beag or Tanera Beg is an uninhabited island in the Summer Isles off north west Scotland.

It is called "Tanera Beag" ("Little Tanera") to distinguish it from Tanera Mòr, "Big Tanera".

References

Summer Isles
Uninhabited islands of Highland (council area)